Taleporia henderickxi is a moth of the Psychidae family. It is found on Crete and is the sole Taleporia species known to occur there.

Taleporia henderickxi is dedicated to Belgian entomologist Hans Henderickx.

References

Moths described in 2016
Moths of Europe
Psychidae